Myron B. Dossett (born January 9, 1961) is an American politician and a Republican member of the Kentucky House of Representatives representing District 9 since January 2007.

Education
Dossett attended Murray State University.

Elections
2012 Dossett was unopposed for both the May 22, 2012 Republican Primary, and the November 6, 2012 General election, winning with 6,670 votes.
2006 When District 9 Democratic Representative James E. Bruce retired and left the seat open, Dossett was unopposed for the 2006 Republican Primary and won the November 7, 2006 General election with 2,759 votes (53.5%) against Democratic nominee Peter MacDonald.
2008 Dossett was unopposed for the 2008 Republican Primary, and won the November 4, 2008 General election with 5,050 votes (58.3%) against Democratic nominee Travis Calhoun, who had run in the 2006 Democratic Primary.
2010 Dossett was unopposed for both the May 18, 2010 Republican Primary and the November 2, 2010 General election, winning with 4,333 votes.

References

External links
Official page at the Kentucky General Assembly

Myron Dossett at Ballotpedia
Myron B. Dossett at OpenSecrets

1961 births
Living people
Republican Party members of the Kentucky House of Representatives
Murray State University alumni
Politicians from Bowling Green, Kentucky
21st-century American politicians